Metallitotuus is the debut album by Finnish heavy metal band Teräsbetoni.

Track listing
 Teräsbetoni – 5:54 ('Reinforced Concrete'. The might and superiority of the Brotherhood.)
 Älä kerro meille – 3:29 ('Don't Tell Us'. The resolve and bloody life of the Brotherhood.)
 Taivas lyö tulta – 3:21 ('Sky Strikes Fire'. Praise of the Brotherhood; exuberant almost to the point of incoherence.)
 Vahva kuin metalli – 3:02 ('Strong as Metal'. The resolve, bloody life and divine favor of the Brotherhood.)
 Silmä silmästä – 3:41 ('Eye for an Eye'. Betrayal and vengeance.)
 Metallisydän – 5:27 ('Metal Heart'. The solitude and resolve of a lone warrior.)
 Orjatar – 3:11 ('Slavewoman'. The pleasure slave of a warrior.)
 Tuonelaan – 3:33 ('To the Underworld'. Assassination and post-mortem vengeance.)
 Metallitotuus – 4:30 ('Metal Truth'. The values and conquests of the Brotherhood.)
 Voittamaton – 3:50 ('Invincible'. The might and perseverance of the Brotherhood.)
 Teräksen varjo – 4:32 ('Shadow of Steel'. Riding into battle.)
 Maljanne nostakaa – 6:05 ('Raise Your Cup'. Rest and reflection after a battle.)

Personnel
 Jarkko Ahola - lead vocals, bass
 Arto Järvinen - guitar, vocals
 Viljo Rantanen - guitar
 Jari Kuokkanen - drums

2005 debut albums
Teräsbetoni albums
Finnish-language albums